Kyoto held a mayoral election on February 17, 2008. Daisaku Kadokawa narrowly won over a candidate backed by the JCP with a margin of 951 votes. The poll was to choose a successor to Yorikane Masumoto, who announced his resignation after serving three terms for a total 12 years in office

Candidates 

 Daisaku Kadokawa, 57, former head of Kyoto Municipal Board of Education and supported by all major parties except the JCP.
 Kazuo Nakamura, 53, working as a lawyer and supported by the Japanese Communist Party
 Shoei Murayama, 29, independent former member of the Kyoto municipal assembly
 Toshihiko Okada, 61, independent

Results

References 

Kyoto
2008 elections in Japan
Mayoral elections in Japan
February 2008 events in Japan
Mayors of Kyoto